Lisa is a 1990 American thriller film directed by Gary Sherman and starring Staci Keanan, D. W. Moffett, Cheryl Ladd and Jeffrey Tambor. Its plot follows a teenage girl's infatuation with a stranger that, unknown to her, is a serial killer-stalker.

Plot
Fourteen-year-old Lisa Holland lives with her mother Katherine, a successful florist, in Venice Beach, California. Lisa is beginning to show a keen interest in boys but is not allowed to date due to her mother’s strict rule about not dating until she is 16. It is revealed that Katherine had Lisa when she was 14 years old. Abandoned by Lisa's father, Katherine was forced to leave home after her parents demanded that she put Lisa up for adoption. These facts have made Katherine very wary about Lisa dating, feeling she would end up like her mother. Lisa’s desire to have a boyfriend is furthered by her best friend Wendy Marks, whose less-strict mother and father have allowed her to start dating.

Meanwhile, there is a serial killer running loose in Venice Beach, nicknamed the Candlelight Killer, so called because he rapes his victims by candlelight before killing them. The Candlelight Killer is a suave, good-looking, and successful restaurateur named Richard, who looks more like a sexy model than a serial killer. Richard stalks good-looking women once he finds out where they live. Uniquely, Richard calls his victims over the telephone leaving messages on their answering machines saying he is in their house and is going to kill them. As the women are listening to his message, Richard grabs them from behind and then begins his vicious attacks.

One night, Lisa is coming home from the convenience store, and accidentally runs into Richard, leaving the house of another victim. Lisa is mesmerized by his good looks and follows him to his car once he leaves, copying down his license plate number. Through the DMV she is able to get his address and telephone number. Lisa then begins to call up Richard on the phone and engages him in seductive conversation. Richard is intrigued by their conversations, yet is more interested in finding out who she is, mainly because he is the one now being stalked.

Lisa and Wendy follow Richard, finding out where he lives and works. Lisa even gets into Richard's car alone at one point only to have to hide in the back seat when he unexpectedly shows up. All this goes on unknown to Katherine, and with each succeeding conversation, in which Lisa reveals more about herself, Richard pushes Lisa towards meeting him for a date. Still at a standoff with her mother when it comes to dating, Wendy suggests that Lisa set up Katherine with Richard, implying that maybe if her mother "gets some", she will ease up and allow Lisa to date.

As Easter weekend approaches, Lisa plans to go away with Wendy and her family to Big Bear, California. Katherine and Lisa decide to have a girls' night out dinner before she leaves, and Lisa makes reservations at Richard's restaurant. Lisa calls Richard informing him that she will be at the restaurant that night. Katherine goes to the bathroom ordering Lisa to pay the bill with her credit card. Richard gets a love note from Lisa with the bill, which reveals Katherine's credit card information, which he uses to track her down. When Lisa and Katherine arrive home, the two start bickering over Lisa's dating. Lisa immediately shouts back at Katherine and her stupid rules and that maybe if she got it once in a while, she wouldn't be such a bitch to her mother's dismay. Katherine orders Lisa to go to her room and grounds her, while taking her phone from her room.

Meanwhile, Richard begins to stalk the unsuspecting Katherine. While in Big Bear, Lisa decides to give Richard a call. He reveals to her that he knows her name is Katherine, and that he knows where she lives. On the night Lisa is to return from Big Bear, Katherine enters the apartment and hears a message from Richard. Meanwhile, Lisa returns home and enters the apartment. Running into her room, she is attacked by Richard who has knocked her mother unconscious. Richard brings Lisa into Katherine's bedroom and plans to assault her; Lisa sees the candles and realizes he is the Candlelight Killer. However, Katherine regains consciousness and knocks out Richard from behind and sends him through a window to his death. Relieved to be alive, mother and daughter collapse into each other's arms.

Cast 
 Cheryl Ladd as Katherine Holland
 D. W. Moffett as Richard / The Candlelight Killer
 Staci Keanan as Lisa Holland
 Tanya Fenmore as Wendy Marks
 Jeffrey Tambor as Mr. Marks, Wendy's Father
 Julie Cobb as Mrs. Marks, Wendy's Mother
 Edan Gross as Ralph Marks, Wendy's Brother

Release
Lisa released to theaters on April 20, 1990 through United Artists. It achieved a domestic gross of $4,347,648, with an opening night of $1,119,895.

Home media
Lisa received a home video release in December 1990. The movie received a DVD release as part of MGM MOD Wave 16 and was released on June 28, 2012. A Blu-ray edition, featuring a commentary track from director Gary Sherman and an interview with D. W. Moffett supervised by Scorpion Releasing, was released in December 2015 by Kino Lorber.

Reception 
Critical reception for the film was negative; praise tended to center upon Ladd's performance while criticism centered around the script and tropes. Roger Ebert gave the film 1 1/2 stars, stating that it was "a bludgeon movie with little respect for the audience's intelligence, and simply pounds us over the head with violence whenever there threatens to be a lull." A reviewer for The Ottawa Citizen was also critical, praising Ladd's performance while also criticizing the film as "hysterical and transparent in its attempt to scare audience members into hosing down their hormones."

References

External links
 
 
 

1990 films
1990s American films
1990s English-language films
1990s thriller drama films
American serial killer films
American thriller drama films
Films about stalking
Films directed by Gary Sherman
Films scored by Joe Renzetti
Films set in Los Angeles
Films shot in Los Angeles
Metro-Goldwyn-Mayer films
United Artists films